This is a list of the number-one hits of 2022 on Italy's Singles and Albums Charts, ranked by the Federazione Industria Musicale Italiana (FIMI).

Chart history

See also
 2022 in music
 List of number-one hits in Italy

References

Italy
2022